Counterplot is a 1959 film noir crime film directed by Kurt Neumann and written by Richard Blake. The film stars Forrest Tucker, Allison Hayes, Gerald Milton, Jackie Wayne, Richard Verney and Miguel Ángel Álvarez. The film was released in October 1959, by United Artists.

It was the final film directed by the German-born Neumann.

Plot

Cast 
Forrest Tucker as Brock Miller
Allison Hayes as Connie Lane
Gerald Milton as Bergmann
Jackie Wayne as Manuel
Richard Verney as Ben Murdock
Miguel Ángel Álvarez as Spargo 
Rita Tanno as Girl
Ulises Brenes as Nibley 
Edmundo Rivera Álvarez as Alfred
Guardo Albani as Police Chief
Charles Gibb as Steve MacGregor
Yvonne Peck as Maid
Art Bedard as Dugan
Raúl Dávila as Messenger

References

External links 
 

1959 films
United Artists films
American crime drama films
1959 crime drama films
Films directed by Kurt Neumann
Films scored by Paul Sawtell
1950s English-language films
1950s American films